Upper Rawcliffe-with-Tarnacre is a civil parish in the Wyre district of Lancashire, England.   It contains nine buildings that are recorded in the National Heritage List for England as designated listed buildings.  Of these, one is listed at Grade I, the highest of the three grades, and the others are at Grade II, the lowest grade.  The parish includes the village of St Michael's on Wyre and is otherwise rural.  The River Wyre passes through the parish, and a bridge crossing it is listed.  The other listed buildings are a church and associated mounting block, a country house, a pair of gate piers, a war memorial, two milestones, and a combined milestone and boundary stone.


Key

Buildings

References

Citations

Sources

Lists of listed buildings in Lancashire
Buildings and structures in the Borough of Wyre